Raymond Clinton Isom (born December 27, 1965) is a former American football defensive back who played for the Tampa Bay Buccaneers of the National Football League (NFL). He played college football at Penn State University.

References 

1965 births
Living people
Players of American football from Harrisburg, Pennsylvania
American football defensive backs
Penn State Nittany Lions football players
Tampa Bay Buccaneers players